Tara is a 2013 Hindi drama film directed and produced by Kumar Raj. It was released on 12 July 2013. The film features Rekha Rana, Rohan Shroff, and Sapna P. Chuobisha.

References

External links

Indian romance films
2010s Hindi-language films
Indian thriller films
2013 films
2010s thriller films